Ricardo Gómez (born November 14, 1995) is an American soccer player who plays as a midfielder for Tormenta FC in USL League One.

Career

Tormenta FC
In October 2018, Gómez joined Tormenta FC ahead of their inaugural season in USL League One. He made his league debut for the club on March 29, 2019 in a 1-0 home victory over the Greenville Triumph.

References

External links
 
 Ricardo Gómez - Men's Soccer - USF Athletics
 Ricardo Gómez - Men's Soccer - Apache Athletics

1995 births
Living people
People from Gainesville, Georgia
Sportspeople from the Atlanta metropolitan area
Soccer players from Georgia (U.S. state)
American soccer players
Association football midfielders
South Florida Bulls men's soccer players
Myrtle Beach Mutiny players
Tormenta FC players
USL League One players
USL League Two players